Live at Fillmore West is an album by King Curtis, released in 1971. The album showcases the concert he played with his band the Kingpins at the Fillmore West venue in San Francisco in March 1971 who were supporting and backing soul singer Aretha Franklin. A week after its release in August 1971, Curtis was stabbed to death outside his brownstone apartment in New York City.

It was reissued on compact disc in the 1990s through Rhino Records and was released in an expanded edition in 2006. In addition it was released as an expanded edition four-CD box set entitled, Don't Fight the Feeling: The Complete Aretha Franklin & King Curtis Live At Fillmore West by Rhino Handmade in 2005, featuring the complete concert by King Curtis and Aretha Franklin. This edition was limited to 5000 numbered copies.

History
Recorded at the Fillmore West concert hall, the storied rock venue in San Francisco, over three nights, March 5, 6 and 7 1971, King Curtis and his band the Kingpins were supporting Aretha Franklin as well as playing as her backing band. the album opens with his own composition "Memphis Soul Stew", but the bulk of the album is taken with cover versions of recent rock, soul and country recordings including Stevie Wonder's "Signed, Sealed, Delivered I'm Yours", Led Zeppelin's "Whole Lotta Love" and Bobbie Gentry's "Ode to Billie Joe". His version of Procol Harum's "A Whiter Shade of Pale" found renewed fame when used in the opening title sequence of cult British comedy film Withnail and I, although the film is set in 1969, two years before the performance.

Professionally Curtis was having a prolific and successful time in the summer of 1971. Aretha Franklin's Live at Fillmore West album was a huge hit, he had contributed to two tracks on John Lennon's album, Imagine, recorded the theme to the television show Soul Train and had made a highly acclaimed performance at the Montreux Jazz Festival with Champion Jack Dupree. It was in this climate that the album was released in August 1971. A week after its release, Curtis was stabbed to death outside his brownstone apartment in New York City, following an argument with two drug addicts. The day after he died the album peaked at No. 54 on the Billboard 200 album chart, his greatest success as a solo artist.  There is a widely held misconception that Curtis was murdered on the night of this live performance.  Ralph Brown, in the audio commentary on the DVD issue of Withnail and I, wrongly states that he was shot in the car park after the concert.

Track listing

Live at Fillmore West (original edition)
Released August 1971

Live at Fillmore West (expanded edition)
Released July 11, 2006, featuring 5 additional tracks.

Don't Fight the Feeling: The Complete Aretha Franklin & King Curtis Live at Fillmore West
4 CD Box-set. Released May 3, 2005 by Rhino Handmade in a limited edition of 5000.

Chart performance

Album

Single

Personnel
 King Curtis - tenor saxophone
 Cornell Dupree - electric guitar
 Jerry Jemmott - bass guitar
 Pancho Morales - congas
 Billy Preston - Hammond B-3 organ
 Bernard Purdie - drums
 Truman Thomas - electric piano

The Memphis Horns:
 Jack Hale - trombone
 Roger Hopps - trumpet
 Wayne Jackson - lead trumpet
 Andrew Love - tenor saxophone
 Jimmy Mitchell - baritone saxophone

References

Albums produced by Arif Mardin
Albums recorded at the Fillmore
1971 live albums
Atlantic Records live albums
King Curtis albums
Albums produced by King Curtis
Albums produced by Jerry Wexler